Cha Chi-ming  (1914 – 28 March 2007), was a Hong Kong industrialist, entrepreneur and philanthropist. He was the Chairman of CDW International Limited, Mingly Corporation Limited, and Hong Kong Resort International Limited and also a member of the Hong Kong Special Administrative Region Preparatory Committee, a member of the Hong Kong Basic Law Drafting Committee, and a Hong Kong Affairs Adviser.

Life
Cha was born in Haining, Zhejiang Province. He was a distant paternal relative of the wuxia novelist Louis Cha. He studied textile technology and graduated from Zhejiang University in 1931. In 1994, he donated US$20 million to create the Qiu Shi Science and Technologies Foundation. The Foundation awards prizes such as the Qiu Shi Science and Technology Prize, to Chinese scientists who have made significant advances in their fields.

Memorial 
The Memorial of Cha Chi Ming is located inside of the main building of Haining Library, Zhejiang, China.

Honours
 Justice of the Peace, Hong Kong, 1971
 Grand Bauhinia Medal, Hong Kong, 1997

References

External links
Hong Kong Resorts International 
Hong Kong Standard 

HKR International
Hong Kong chief executives
Recipients of the Grand Bauhinia Medal
1914 births
2007 deaths
People from Haining
Zhejiang University alumni
Businesspeople from Jiaxing
Hong Kong Basic Law Drafting Committee members
Hong Kong Affairs Advisors
Members of the Selection Committee of Hong Kong
Politicians from Jiaxing
Chinese emigrants to British Hong Kong